Hendrik van den Bergh may refer to:
Hendrik van den Bergh (count) (1573-1638), Dutch count, who served in the Spanish military
Hendrik van den Bergh (police official) (1914-1997), South African police official